The Catalan Football Federation (FCF) is the football association responsible for administering football in Catalonia. It was formed on 11 November 1900 as the Football Associació de Catalunya. It was the first football association founded in Spain. The first president was Eduard Alesson and the original members included FC Barcelona, Català SC, Hispania AC and Sociedad Española de Football.

Between 1903 and 1940, the federation organised the Campionat de Catalunya, the first league championship ever played in Spain. Since 1904, the federation has also organised the Catalonia national football team. 

Today, the federation continues to organise its own club competition, the Copa Catalunya. It also administers Tercera División Group 5 and the Primera Catalana within the Spanish football league system, and the Catalonia amateur football team which represents those leagues in regional competitions.

Presidents

External links
 

Football in Catalonia
Spanish football associations
Football
Sports organizations established in 1900
1900 establishments in Catalonia